The 2023 Tournoi de France was the third edition of the Tournoi de France, an international women's football tournament. It was held in Laval and Angers, France between 15 and 21 February 2023.

France won the title for the third time.

Format
The four invited teams played a round-robin tournament. Points awarded in the group stage followed the formula of three points for a win, one point for a draw, and zero points for a loss. A tie in points was decided by goal differential.

Teams

Squads

Standings

Results
All times are local (UTC+2).

Goalscorers

References

2023 in women's association football
Tournoi de France
February 2023 sports events in France
Tournoi de France (Women)